Notioclepsis is a monotypic genus of moths belonging to the subfamily Tortricinae of the family Tortricidae. It contains only one species, Notioclepsis synnoa, which is found on Sumatra.

See also
List of Tortricidae genera

References

External links
tortricidae.com

Archipini
Monotypic moth genera
Moths of Asia
Moths described in 1983
Tortricidae genera